Yves Claude Vinh-San, also Prince Nguyen Phuc Bảo Vàng, (April 8, 1934 – July 13, 2016), was a jazz musician and a son of Vietnamese Emperor Duy Tân and Fernande Antier - a French born-woman who was Duy Tan's third wife. He published a jazz album entitled Claude Vinh San et le jazz tropical. He was born in Saint-Denis, Réunion Island.

Reburial of Duy Tan 
In 1987, Vinh-San escorted the remains of his father Emperor Duy Tân with other members of the royal family to Vietnam in a traditional ceremony to rest in the tomb of his grandfather, Emperor Dục Đức.

Author
Vinh-San wrote two books, Duy Tân, Empereur d'Annam 1900-1945 (2001) and Hommage au prince Vinh San et à l'Empereur Duy Tan : au commandement de Forces françaises libres (2012).

References

External links
 Duy Tan, Emperor of Annam 1900-1945
 Claude Vinh-San plays the accordion

1934 births
2016 deaths
People from Saint-Denis, Réunion
Vietnamese jazz composers
Vietnamese jazz trumpeters
Vietnamese musicians
French people of Vietnamese descent
Vietnamese writers
Nguyen dynasty princes
People of Vietnamese descent from Réunion
French-language literature of Vietnam